Hessen Cassel is an unincorporated community in Marion Township, Allen County, in the U.S. state of Indiana.

History
Hessen Cassel was platted in 1863. Hessen Cassel was originally built up chiefly by Germans, and was named for the Landgraviate of Hesse-Kassel in Germany.

Geography

References

Unincorporated communities in Allen County, Indiana
Unincorporated communities in Indiana
Fort Wayne, IN Metropolitan Statistical Area